Qalam Institute of Higher Education is a for-profit private coeducational higher education institution in Kabul, Afghanistan.

Qalam is officially accredited and/or recognized by the Afghan Ministry of Higher Education.

References

External links
https://www.qalam.edu.af
https://www.4icu.org/reviews/17925.htm
http://www.hamee.af/qalam-higher-education-institute/
https://edurank.org/uni/qalam-institute-of-higher-education/
https://directory.ooyta.com/about/qalam-institute-of-higher-education-qihe-.html
https://mohe.gov.af/en/node/1953
http://www.afghan-bios.info/index.php?option=com_afghanbios&id=1406&task=view&total=3487&start=2531&Itemid=2
https://www.washingtontimes.com/topics/gul-rahman-qazi/
https://pajhwok.com/photo/prof-gul-rahman-qazi/

 Education in Afghanistan